John Thomas Whittle (29 June 1910 – 31 July 1987) was an English footballer. His regular position was as a forward. He was born in Leigh, Lancashire. He played for Manchester United and Rossendale United.

External links
MUFCInfo.com profile

1910 births
1987 deaths
English footballers
Manchester United F.C. players
Rossendale United F.C. players
Association football forwards